Untitled (Scoop) is a promotional EP of exclusively instrumental songs by German electronica band The Notwist used to promote their album Neon Golden.  After the success of Neon Golden, subsequent re-releases of the album contained the tracks from this EP as bonus songs.

Track listing
"Scoop" - 3:26
"Propeller 9" - 4:25
"Formiga" - 2:21

2002 EPs
The Notwist albums